Mubarak Yussif (born 29 December 1995) is a Ghanaian professional footballer who plays as defender for Ghana Premier League side Asante Kotoko S.C. He previously played for Liberty Professionals and Ashanti Gold.

Club career

Liberty Professionals 
Mubarik started his career with Liberty Professionals before moving to Ashanti Gold in 2018. On 6 March 2016, he made his debut for Liberty in a 0–0 match against Wa All Stars, playing the full 90 minutes in the process. He made 20 league matches during the 2016 Ghanaian Premier League to help Liberty avoid relegation by 2 points. The following season, he established himself as a starter and played a key role during the 2017 Ghanaian Premier League season. He played in all 30 league matches to help Liberty avoid relegation and place 11th on the league table. Based on his performances, he was linked with Ashanti Gold during the transfer period, later signing for them in 2018. During his time with the club he formed a formidable defensive partnership with Samuel Sarfo.

Ashanti Gold 
In March 2018, Mubarik was signed by Obuasi-based club Ashanti Gold ahead of the 2018 Ghanaian Premier League on a 2-year deal. He was seen as a direct replacement for Abeiku Ainooson and Richard Ocran who had left the club at the end of the 2017 season. He made his debut on 28 March 2018 in a 1–0 win over Karela United, coming on in the 89th minute for Godfred Asiamah. He later went on to appear on the bench in a 1–1 draw match against Bechem United on 31 March 2018, before getting injured in June 2018. He was out on the sidelines for five months, returning in September 2018, when the league had already been abandoned due to the dissolution of the GFA in June 2018, as a result of the Anas Number 12 Expose. He featured for Ashanti Gold during their 2019–20 CAF Confederation Cup campaign. During the 2019 GFA Normalization Committee Special Competition, he featured in 12 out of 13 matches to help Ashanti Gold top group B ahead of city rivals Asante Kotoko and subsequently win Tier 2 of the competition to qualify for the 2020–21 CAF Confederation Cup.

On 29 December 2019, he scored his first goal in the Ghana Premier League after scoring from an assist by Richard Osei Agyemang to help Ashanti Gold to an eventual 3–0 win over Accra Great Olympics. On 5 January 2020, he scored the only goal in a match against King Faisal Babes to grant Ashanti Gold all the three points at the Baba Yara Stadium. He played in 14 out of 15 league matches and scored 2 goals in 2019–20 Ghana Premier League season, before the league was cancelled as a result of the COVID-19 pandemic. During the season he formed a defensive partnership with Ibrahim Samed which regarded as one of the best before the league was truncated. He parted ways with the club upon the expiration of his contract in August 2020.

Asante Kotoko 
In August 2020, after his contract with Ashanti Gold expired, Mubarik revealed that Asante Kotoko had shown interest in signing him and had started talks in trying to get him to join them. On 30 September 2020, Asante Kotoko announced that they had signed him on a free transfer to bolster Maxwell Konadu's squad ahead of their CAF Champions League campaign and the 2020–21 Ghana Premier League. He signed a 3-year deal after successful negotiations and completing his mandatory medical examination.

International career 
Mubarik was given his first call up to the Ghana national team in February 2019 ahead of Africa Cup of Nations qualifiers against South Africa and Sao Tome and Principe. He was dropped but later recalled back into the team along with Justice Blay.

References

External links 

 
 

Living people
1995 births
Association football defenders
Ghanaian footballers
Liberty Professionals F.C. players
Ashanti Gold SC players
Asante Kotoko S.C. players
Ghana Premier League players
Footballers from Kumasi